Fedeli is an Italian surname. In 2013, there were approximately 1,906 people in Italy with this surname, mainly in Lombardy, Lazio and Tuscany.

Notable people
Notable people with this surname include:
 Filippo Fedeli (born 1983), Italian football player
 Vic Fedeli (born 1956), Canadian politician

References